is a Japanese freestyle swimmer. She competed in the women's 4 × 100 metre freestyle relay event at the 2017 World Aquatics Championships.

References

External links
 

1994 births
Living people
Japanese female freestyle swimmers
Place of birth missing (living people)
Universiade silver medalists for Japan
Universiade bronze medalists for Japan
Universiade medalists in swimming
Medalists at the 2015 Summer Universiade